Love Sensuality Devotion: The Remix Collection is a remix album by the German musical project Enigma, released on 8 October 2001 by Virgin Records. All of the remixes on the album were taken from previously released singles. Virgin Records reissued the album in the United States on 26 December 2006.

Track listing
"Turn Around" (Northern Lights Club Mix) (135 BPM) (Michael Cretu, Jens Gad) – 10:27
"Age of Loneliness" (Enigmatic Club Mix) (128 BPM) (Curly M.C.) – 6:14
"Push the Limits" (ATB Remix) (133 BPM) (Cretu, Gad) – 7:51
"Gravity of Love" (Judgement Day Club Mix) (140 BPM) (Cretu) – 5:59
"Return to Innocence" (380 Midnight Mix) (088 BPM) (Curly) – 5:42
"Sadeness (Part I)" (Violent U.S. Remix) (095 BPM) (Curly, F. Gregorian, David Fairstein) – 4:43
"Principles of Lust" (Everlasting Lust Mix) (095 BPM) (Curly) – 4:56
"Mea Culpa" (Fading Shades Mix) (100 BPM) (Curly, Fairstein) – 6:04
"T.N.T. for the Brain" (Midnight Man Mix) (112 BPM) (Curly) – 5:56

Charts

References

2001 remix albums
Enigma (German band) albums
Virgin Records remix albums